Maurice Smith may refer to:

Maurice Smith (fighter) (born 1961), American kickboxer and mixed martial artist
Maurice Smith (running back) (born 1976), American football player 
Maurice Smith (cornerback) (born 1995), American football player 
Maurice Smith (journalist) (1909–1985), England-born Canadian journalist
Maurice Smith (decathlete) (born 1980), Jamaican decathlete
Maurice Smith (politician), MLA for Nova Scotia
Maurice J. "Clipper" Smith (1898–1984), American football player and coach
Maurice K. Smith (1926–2020), New Zealand-born architect and architectural educator
Maurice Smith (racing driver), American racing driver

See also
Morris Smith (disambiguation)